Sheyh Hamid-i Vali (1331–1412), better known by his sobriquet Somunju Baba, was an ascetic teacher of Islam in Bursa, Turkey, who exerted extensive influence and is known as a Muslim saint. He was born in Kayseri and died in Aksaray. He taught at the Ulu Camii (The Great Mosque) where he was installed by Sultan Bayezid I after it was completed. Somunju Baba's students included Molla Fenari and Hacı Bayram-ı Veli.

Biography 
Somunju Baba is one of the virtuous men who came to Anadolu for spiritual conquest, he was also a descendant of Islamic prophet Muhammad After receiving an education in cities which are the center of knowledge like Şam, Tabriz, Erdebil, he settled in Bursa for his guidance and duty. He taught at the Bursa Grand Mosque where he was installed by Sultan Bayezid I after it was completed. For hiding his spiritual side, he baked bread and sold them so he was known as Somunju Baba. He became known after he had translated the sura of Al-Fatiha, in seven different ways during the opening of Bursa Grand Mosque, in Bursa. He avoided becoming famous so he left Bursa and moved Aksaray. He left his son Yusuf Hakiki Baba in Aksaray and he went to Mecca with his son Halil Taybi when they got back to Anadolu they settled in Aksaray and he died here in 1412. His tomb is still in Aksaray.

With the help of Es-Seyyid Osman Hulusi Efendi Foundation, it has another mosque,a library, museum and an exhibition hall and it became a complex of building with restoration. With its excursion, it is an attractive center of local and foreign tourists.

Somunju Baba's students 
 Hacı Bayram-ı Veli - Ankara
 Molla Şemseddin Fenari - Bursa
 Akşemseddin - Göynük
 Akbıyık Sultan - Bursa
 Şeyh Üftade - Bursa
 Aziz Mahmud Hudayi - Bursa
 Halil Taybi - Darende
 Baba Yusuf Hakiki - Aksaray
 Bıçakçı Ömer Dede - Göynük
 Hızır Dede- Bursa
 İnce Bedreddin - Darende
 Yazıcıoğlu - Gelibolu
 Şeyh Lutfullah - Balıkesir
 Şeyhî - Kütahya
 Muslihiddin Halife - İskilip
 Uzun Selahaddin - Bolu

References 
 Akgündüz, Ahmet (1992) Arşiv belgeleri ışığında Şeyh Hâmid-i Velî Somuncu Baba ve neseb-i âlîsi Es-Seyyid Osman Hulûsi Efendi Vakfı, Istanbul,  (biography of Hamidüddin Aksarayî in Turkish)
  
 Somuncu Baba ve Neseb-i Âlisi
 Akgündüz, Ahmet (2009) Arşiv Belgeleri Işığında Somuncu Baba ve Neseb-i Âlisi , Osmanlı Araştırmaları Vakfı, Istanbul,  (Biography of Somuncu Baba with the Ottoman Archives)  
 Somuncu Baba ve Neseb-i Âlisi
 Prof.Dr. Ahmet Akgündüz Symposium about Somuncu Baba 
 Somuncu Baba ve Neseb-i Âlisi, Somuncu Baba culture and literature magazine
 Opening of Somunju Baba Mosque

Somuncu Baba Tomb and Mosque in Darende

References

1331 births
1412 deaths
Islam in Turkey
Scientists from the Ottoman Empire
Turkish Sufis
Sufis
Sufi saints
Muslim saints
14th-century Muslim scholars of Islam
Islamic scholars from the Ottoman Empire